Gazeau is a French surname. Notable people with the surname include:

Jean-Pierre Gazeau (born 1945), French mathematician and physicist
Sylvie Gazeau (born 1950), French violinist

French-language surnames